Henneguya is a genus of myxosporean parasites belonging to the family Myxobolidae.

The species of this genus are found in Europe and America.

Species according to GBIF (except H. adherens):
 Henneguya adherens Azevedo & Matos
 Henneguya akule Work, Takata, Whipps & Kent, 2008
 Henneguya amazonica Rocha, Matos & Azevedo, 1992
 Henneguya brachideuteri Kpatcha, Faye, Diebakate, Fall & Toguebaye, 1997
 Henneguya clariae Abolarin, 1971
 Henneguya clini Reed, Basson, Van As & Dykova, 2007
 Henneguya creplini (Gurley, 1894)
 Henneguya doori Guilford, 1963
 Henneguya friderici Casal, Matos & Azevedo, 2003
 Henneguya garavelli Martins & Onaka, 2006
 Henneguya joalensis Kpatcha, Faye, Diebakate, Fall & Toguebaye, 1997
 Henneguya kayarensis Kpatcha, Faye, Diebakate, Fall & Toguebaye, 1997
 Henneguya lagodon Hall & Iverson, 1967
 Henneguya lateolabracis Yokoyama, Kawakami, Yasuda & Tanaka, 2003
 Henneguya lutjani Kpatcha, Faye, Diebakate, Fall & Toguebaye, 1997
 Henneguya maculosus Carriero, Adriano, Silva, Ceccarelli & Maia, 2013
 Henneguya mbourensis Kpatcha, Faye, Diebakate, Fall & Toguebaye, 1997
 Henneguya neapolitana Parisi, 1912
 Henneguya nuesslini Schuberg & Schröder, 1905
 Henneguya nusslini Schuberg & Schröder, 1905
 Henneguya ocellata Iverson & Yokel, 1963
 Henneguya ouakamensis Kpatcha, Faye, Diebakate, Fall & Toguebaye, 1997
 Henneguya pagri Yokoyama, Itoh & Tanaka, 2005
 Henneguya priacanthi Kpatcha, Faye, Diebakate, Fall & Toguebaye, 1997
 Henneguya psorospermica Thélohan, 1892
 Henneguya salminicola Ward, 1919
 Henneguya salvelini Zandt, 1923
 Henneguya sebasta Moser & Love, 1975
 Henneguya shackletoni Brickle, Kalavati & MacKenzie, 2006
 Henneguya shariffi Molnár, Székely, Mohamed & Shaharom-Harrison, 2006
 Henneguya symphodae Lubat, Radujkovic, Marques & Bouix, 1989
 Henneguya unitaeniata Úngari, Vieira, da Silva, Santos, de Azevedo & O'Dwyer, 2019
 Henneguya vitensis Laird, 1950
 Henneguya yoffensis Kpatcha, Faye, Diebakate, Fall & Toguebaye, 1997
 Henneguya zahoori Bhatt & Siddiqui, 1964
 Henneguya zschokkei (Gurley, 1894)

References

Cnidarian genera
Myxobolidae